In enzymology, a protocatechuate 3,4-dioxygenase is an enzyme that catalyzes the chemical reaction

3,4-dihydroxybenzoate + O2  3-carboxy-cis,cis-muconate

Thus, the two substrates of this enzyme are 3,4-dihydroxybenzoate (protocatechuic acid) and O2, whereas its product is 3-carboxy-cis,cis-muconate.

This enzyme belongs to the family of oxidoreductases, specifically those acting on single donors with O2 as oxidant and incorporation of two atoms of oxygen into the substrate (oxygenases).   The systematic name of this enzyme class is protocatechuate:oxygen 3,4-oxidoreductase (decyclizing). Other names in common use include protocatechuate oxygenase, protocatechuic acid oxidase, protocatechuic 3,4-dioxygenase, and protocatechuic 3,4-oxygenase.  This enzyme participates in benzoate degradation via hydroxylation and 2,4-dichlorobenzoate degradation.  It employs one cofactor, iron.

This enzyme has been found effective at improving organic fluorophore-stability in single-molecule experiments. Commercial preps of the enzyme isolated from Pseudomonas spp. generally require further purification to remove strong contaminating nuclease activity.

Structural studies 

See also 
 Protocatechuic acid

References 

 
 
 

EC 1.13.11
Iron enzymes
Enzymes of known structure
Natural phenols metabolism